Los Arrieros is an unincorporated community and census-designated place in Starr County, Texas, United States. Its population was 91 as of the 2010 census. U.S. Route 83 passes through the community.

Geography

Education
It is in the Roma Independent School District. The zoned elementary school for the 2010 Census community is Emma Vera Elementary School. Roma High School is the district's sole comprehensive high school.

References

Census-designated places in Starr County, Texas
Census-designated places in Texas